The Missouri Escarpment is a ridge in North Dakota approximately 100 miles to the west of the Red River Valley, at the edge of the Missouri Plateau.  It divides the Central Lowlands province from the Great Plains province.

External links
US Geological Survey

Escarpments of the United States
Landforms of North Dakota